

Storms
Note:  indicates the name was retired after that usage in the respective basin

 Saba (1983) – a weak tropical cyclone that remained very far at sea.

 Sadie (1994) – a weak, short-lived tropical cyclone that affected northern Australia.

 Sagar (2018) – a cyclonic storm that made landfall in Somalia.

 Sally
 1954 – Category 5 super typhoon that impacted the Philippines.
 1959 – a strong tropical storm affected Philippines.
 1961 – a category 1 typhoon impact Taiwan and South China.
 1964 – a Category 5 super typhoon that brought widespread impacts across the Northwest Pacific.
 1967 – a category 2 typhoon impact Philippines.
 1970 – did not make landfall.
 1971 – a severe cyclone that made landfall in Australia. 
 1972 – a category 1 typhoon made landfall near the Surat Thani.
 1976 – did not threaten land.
 1986 – impacted the Cook Islands.
 1996 – a Category 5 typhoon that made landfall in a similar location in the Philippines before going on to make landfall in China.
 2005 – churned in the open ocean.
 2020 – a Category 2 hurricane that destructed the southern portion of the United States.

Salome (2017) – a tropical storm that affected the Philippines.

 Sam
 1977 – churned in the open ocean; renamed Cyclone Celimene when it crossed 90°E.
 1999 – a severe tropical storm that impacted China.
 2000 – a severe tropical cyclone that impacted Western Australia.
 2021 – A large and long-lived Category 4 hurricane that churned in the open ocean.

 Samuel (2018) – a severe tropical storm that affected the Philippines and Vietnam.
 Sanba
 2012 – a Category 5 super typhoon that affected the Ryukyu Islands and the Korean Peninsula.
 2018 – a tropical storm that affected a few minor Pacific islands.

 Sandra
 1985 – a Category 3 hurricane that stayed in the open ocean.  
 2013 – a Category 3 severe tropical cyclone that caused minor effects on some South Pacific islands.
 2015 – a Category 4 major hurricane, the strongest November Pacific hurricane on record.
 2021 – a weak tropical storm that formed far out into sea.

 Sandy
 1985 – a severe tropical cyclone that affected Northern Australia.
 2012 – a Category 3 major hurricane that inflicted nearly $70 billion (2012 USD) in damage and killed 233 people across eight countries from the Caribbean to Canada.

 Santi
 2009 – a Category 2 typhoon that impacted Philippines and Vietnam.
2013 – a Category 3 typhoon that impacted Philippines and Vietnam, killing 93 people.

 Sanvu
 2005 – a severe tropical storm that struck southern China.
 2012 – a severe tropical storm that remained in open sea.
 2017 – a Category 2 typhoon that remained in open sea.

 Saola
 2005 – a Category 3 typhoon that remained at sea.
 2012 – a Category 2 typhoon that affected Taiwan and East China, which also brought torrential rainfall in the Philippines.
 2017 – a severe tropical storm that affected Japan.

 Saomai
 2000 – a long-tracked Category 5 super typhoon that impacted southern Japan and the Korean Peninsula.
 2006 – was considered as the strongest typhoon on record to strike East China.

 Sarah
 1951 – remained in open waters.
 1956 – A powerful Category 4 typhoon approached the Philippines Islands, it slowed down and then changed its direction and dissipated.
 1959 – A powerful Category 5 typhoon among the deadliest typhoons on record in the western Pacific Ocean, killing around 2,000 people.
 1962 – Category 1 typhoon that hit Japan.
 1965 – a weak tropical storm that had little impact on Cambodia, Thailand and Malaysia.
 1967 – A powerful Category 4 typhoon made landfall on Wake Island at peak intensity, causing widespread damage.
 1971 – remained in open waters.
 1973 – A powerful tropical storm has affected the Indochina peninsula.
 1977 – A category 1 typhoon struck Philippines and China.
 1979 – a long-living Category 3 typhoon that meandered in the South China Sea.
 1983 – a weak tropical storm that caused significant damage to the Philippines.
 1983 – impacted Fiji as a Category 4 severe tropical cyclone.
 1986 – remained in open waters.
 1989 – a powerful typhoon that caused extensive damage along an erratic path across the Western Pacific in September 1989.
 1994 – a Category 4 severe tropical cyclone that affected Vanuatu and New Caledonia.
 2010 – a weak tropical cyclone that affected a few South Pacific islands.
 2019 – affected the northeastern portion of the Philippines.

 Sarai (2019) – affected Niue and some Pacific islands.

 Sarika
 2004 – a severe tropical storm that did not affect any land.
 2011 – affected the Philippines as a tropical storm.
 2016 – Made landfall in the Philippines as a category 4 typhoon.

 Saudel (2020) – a Category 1 typhoon that impacted the Philippines and Vietnam.

 Savannah (2019) – brought rainfall towards Java and Bali.

 Sean
 2010 – an Australian late-season tropical cyclone that stayed out at sea.
 2011 – a weak November tropical storm that stayed in the Atlantic Ocean.

 Sebastien
 1995 – made landfall in Anguilla as a tropical depression.
 2019 – rare late-season tropical storm that stayed out at sea.

 Selma
 1970 – a strong tropical storm meandered to the north, turning to the northeast and northwest before heading southeastward and dissipating.
 1974 – a category 3 tropical cyclone predicted to impact Darwin, but instead, the system turned westward out to sea and eventually dissipated over open water.
1987 – did not make landfall.
2017 – minimal tropical storm that made landfall in El Salvador, causing minor damage.

 Selwyn
 1986 – a Category 2 tropical cyclone that stayed off the coast of Western Australia.
 1997 – a Category 3 severe tropical cyclone that stayed off the coast of Western Australia.

 Sendong (2011) – a severe tropical storm that destructed southern Philippines, killing about 1,500 people.
 Seniang
 1964 – struck the Philippines and China, killing 75 people.
 1972
 1976
 1980
 1984
1988
1992 – long-lived Category 5 super typhoon that affected the Marshall Islands and struck Guam.
1996 – struck Luzon and then made landfall in Vietnam.
2000 – struck the Philippines.
2006 – swept through the central Philippines in December 2006, exacerbating the damage left behind by previous Philippine typhoon strikes that year. 
2014 – struck the Philippines, causing the deaths of 66 people and ₱1.27 billion in damages.
Sening (1970) – impacted that Philippines as a Category 5 super typhoon, making it the third strongest typhoon to strike the country; Sening killed more than 700 people.

Sepat
 2001 – a tropical storm that did not affect any land.
 2007 – a Category 5 super typhoon that mainly affected China, which caused 43 deaths and around $700 million in damages.
 2013 – a tropical storm that did not affect any land.
 2019 – affected Japan and was recognised as a subtropical storm by the JTWC.

Sergio
 1978 – threatened Baja California.
 1982 – never threatened land.
 2006 – never threatened land.
 2018 – a powerful and long-lived tropical cyclone that affected the Baja California Peninsula as a tropical storm and caused significant flooding throughout southern Texas in early October 2018.

 Seroja (2021) – a deadly tropical cyclone that brought historic flooding and landslides to portions of southern Indonesia and East Timor and later went on to make landfall in Western Australia's Mid West region, becoming the first to do so since Cyclone Elaine in 1999.

 Seth
 1991 – a powerful category 4 typhoon made landfall in the Philippines as a Tropical Storm.
 1994 – a powerful category 4 typhoon that passed along the coast of China and hit South Korea.
 2021 – a category 2 tropical cyclone that affected the northeastern states of Australia.

Seymour
 1992 – a Category 1 hurricane that stayed off the coast of Baja California.
 2016 – a Category 4 hurricane that stayed out in sea.

Shaheen (2021) – a Category 1 tropical cyclone was caused devastating effects mainly Oman, Iran, Saudi Arabia, and UAE.

Shanshan
 2000 – a Category 4 typhoon but it was not a threat to land.
 2006 – a Category 4 super typhoon that impacted Japan.
 2013 – a weak February storm that brought rains to the Philippines, Vietnam and Malaysia.
 2018 – a Category 2 typhoon that remained at sea.

Sharon
 1971 – a November weak and short-lived tropical storm
1991 – a March severe tropical storm that affected some Pacific islands.
1993 – a Category 4 severe tropical cyclone that remained in open waters.
1994 – affected the Philippines and South China bringing torrential rainfall which caused billions of damages.

Shary (2010) – a short-lived tropical cyclone that stayed over the open waters of the North Atlantic in late October 2010.
 
Sheila
1971 – turned out to be the same system as Sophie, which made landfall over Western Australia as a Category 5 severe tropical cyclone.
2005 – a weak, short-lived tropical cyclone.

Sid (1997) – a weak tropical cyclone that brought torrential rainfall and flooding over Northern Australia.

Shirley
1952
1957
1960
1963
1965
1966
1968
1971
1974
1978

Sidr (2007) – a Category 5 cyclone that resulted in one of the worst natural disasters in Bangladesh, with an estimation deaths of around 15,000.

Sikat (2003) – a Category 2 typhoon that did not affect any landmasses.

Simon
1980 – a severe tropical cyclone that impacted Queensland, and New Zealand as a post-tropical cyclone.
 1984 – no known damage or casualties.
 1990 – formed in open water, causing no damage or deaths.
 2014 – Category 4 hurricane that dissipated before striking the Baja California Peninsula.

Sina
1980 – a Category 3 severe tropical cyclone that impacted New Caledonia and New Zealand.
1990 – impacted Fiji as a strong tropical cyclone, causing US$18.5 million in damages.

Sinlaku
 2002 – struck China
 2008 – a Category 4 typhoon that struck Taiwan and approached Japan
 2014 – a late-season tropical storm that struck the Philippines.
 2020 – a weak tropical storm that affected southern China and northern Vietnam.

Siony
 2004 – a Category 4 typhoon that struck Japan.
 2008 – after PAGASA released the final advisory on "Quinta", PAGASA started to reissue advisories on Quinta, however Quinta was renamed as "Siony".
 2020 – a severe tropical storm that affected northern Philippines.

Sisang (1987) – impacted the Philippines as a Category 5 super typhoon, killing 979 people in total.

Sitrang (2022) – a tropical cyclone that affected India and Bangladesh on 25 October 2022. It was the first cyclone to hit Bangladesh since Cyclone Mora in 2017.

Skip
1985 – a minimal typhoon that churned in the open ocean before crossing over into the Central Pacific basin as Tropical Storm Skip.
1988 – a Category 4 typhoon that killed over 200 people while crossing the Philippines; also known as Yoning within the Philippine Area of Responsibility.

Solo (2015) – a tropical cyclone that affected Vanuatu.

Son–Tinh
2012 – a Category 3 typhoon that impacted Vietnam.
2018 – a tropical storm that affected the Philippines and Vietnam.

Sonamu
 2000 – came close to Japan without making landfall.
 2006 – a weak system that did not threat any land.
 2013 – an early forming tropical storm that affected the Philippines.

Sonca
 2005 – an unusually early-season Category 4 typhoon.
 2011 – a Category 2 typhoon that did not affect any land masses.
 2017 – a weak tropical storm that affected Indochina.
 2022 – a weak tropical storm impacted Vietnam.

Songda
 2004 – a Category 4 typhoon that struck Japan.
 2011 – a May Category 5 super typhoon that approached Japan.
 2016 – a Category 4 super typhoon that later approached Canada as a post–tropical storm.
 2022 – brought heavy rains to parts of the Korea Peninsula.

Sonia
 1983 – a weak October tropical storm that never threatened land.
 2013 – a weak tropical storm that made landfall in the Mexican state of Sinaloa, causing minor damage. 

Sose (2001) – a tropical cyclone that affected Vanuatu.

Sophie (1971) – which made landfall over Western Australia as a Category 5 severe tropical cyclone.

Soudelor
2003 – a Category 4 typhoon that affected the Philippines, Taiwan, Japan and South Korea
2009 – a weak tropical storm that affected Southern China
2015 – second-strongest storm of 2015, impacting eastern China as a Category 5 super typhoon.

Soulik
2000 – a late-season Category 3 typhoon that spawned within two calendars.
 2006 – affected the Marianas and Volcano Islands.
 2013 – struck Taiwan and China as a Category 4 typhoon.
2018 – affected Japan as a Category 3 typhoon.
Stan
 1979 – made landfall over the Cape York Peninsula twice.
 2005 – a deadly Category 1 hurricane that impacted Mexico, killing about 1,600 people.
 2016 – made landfall over Western Australia.

Stella (1998) – a powerful tropical storm that reached the coast of Japan and caused serious damage.

Steve
1990 – a Category 4 typhoon that did not affect any land masses.
1993 – a severe tropical storm that affected Taiwan.
2000 – a Category 2 tropical cyclone that mostly affected Northern Australia.

Sue (1975) – a weak tropical cyclone that stayed off the coast of southern Indonesia.

Surigae (2021) – a powerful tropical cyclone east of the Philippines.

Susan
1945
1953 – Category 3 typhoon that struck Taiwan
1958 – Category 3 typhoon
1961
1963 – Category 4-equivalent typhoon
1966
1969 – struck the Central Philippines
1972
1975
1978 – Category 4 hurricane that initially tracked toward Hawaii before sharply veering away.
1981
1984 – struck South Central Vietnam
1988
1997 – Category 5 tropical cyclone that affected Vanuatu, Fiji, and New Zealand; one of the most intense South Pacific tropical cyclones on record.

See also

European windstorm names
Atlantic hurricane season
List of Pacific hurricane seasons
Tropical cyclone naming
South Atlantic tropical cyclone
Tropical cyclone

References
General

 
 
 
 
 
 
 
 
 
 
 
 
 
 
 
 
 

 
 
 
 
 

S